The occipitomastoid suture or occipitotemporal suture is the cranial suture between the occipital bone and the mastoid portion of the temporal bone.

It is continuous with the lambdoidal suture.

See also
 Jugular foramen

Additional images

References

External links

 
 
 

Bones of the head and neck
Cranial sutures
Human head and neck
Joints
Joints of the head and neck
Skeletal system
Skull